Deepali Wijesundera is a judge of the Court of Appeal of the Democratic Socialist Republic of Sri Lanka.

Wijesundera completed her primary and secondary education from Visakha Vidyalaya, Colombo. She attended  the Sri Lanka Law College and was also selected to enter the University of Colombo. In February 1980, she enrolled as an Attorney-at-Law, and also worked as a junior to President's Counsel, VSA Pullenayagam. In 1984, Wijesundera joined the judiciary as a Magistrate 

Deepali Wijesundera father was Justice TAD Wijesundera who had served as a judge of the Supreme Court in Sri Lanka and her sister Menaka Wijesundera is a High Court Judge of Sri Lanka.

Work 
Wijesundera was one of three judges of Colombo High Court trial-at-bar, who had delivered the verdict, of White Flag case, in which former Army Commander Sarath Fonseka was given three years of imprisonment.

References 

Sri Lankan women judges
Year of birth missing (living people)
Living people